Cubatão is a city in the state of São Paulo, Brazil, 12 kilometers away from Santos seaport, the largest in Latin America. It is part of the Metropolitan Region of Baixada Santista. The population is 131,626 (2020 est.) in an area of 142.88 km2. It hosts industries, refining oil, steel mills and fertilizers.

In the early 1980s, Cubatão was one of the most polluted cities in the world, nicknamed "Valley of Death", due to births of brainless children and respiratory, hepatic and blood illnesses. High air pollution was killing forest over hills around the city. It was ranked the top ten dirtiest cities in the world by Popular Science.

Around 12:00 AM (03:00 GMT) on Saturday, 25 February 1984, an oil spill set the shantytown Vila Socó on fire, killing 93 people according to official figures of the government, though the actual death toll may be more than 200.
The contamination of workers with persistent organic pollutants put the now defunct Rhodia into Greenpeace's top 10 world's worst corporate crimes ever in its report to Rio Summit in 1992.

Strong efforts were made to diminish pollution in the city, costing US$ 1.2 billion so far. Although things have improved a lot, it is impossible to completely clean the soil and groundwater and while many large industries continue to work in such a small area, there will always be some pollution.

Popular culture 
Cubatão was mentioned in the Jello Biafra-Sepultura collaboration "Biotech is Godzilla" on the group's 1993 album Chaos A.D.

Cubatão is the name of an A La Carte song from 1981.

Sister cities 

  Taquaritinga, Brazil (1972)
  Conchal, Brazil (1986)
  Peruíbe, Brazil (1991)
  Serra Negra, Brazil (1991)
  Águas de São Pedro, Brazil (1991)
  Aveiro, Portugal (1992)
  Melipilla, Chile (2005)

Divisions

Piaçaguera 
Piaçaguera is a location within the city of Cubatão in the state of São Paulo, Brazil.  The Rodovia Cônego Domênico Rangoni highway, formerly known as the Piaçaguera-Guarujá highway, starts there.  It connects the via Anchieta to Guarujá, crossing the Bertioga canal.  It is there that the climb through the Serra do Mar escarpment begins by way of the Santos-Jundiaí railway line.

"Piaçaguera" is a term from the Tupi language that means "old port" by way of the conjunction of the two words "peasaba" ("port") and "ûera" ("velho").

References

External links 
 Cubatão web site
 EncontraCubatão – Find everything about Cubatão city

 
Populated places established in 1833
Environmental disasters in South America
1833 establishments in Brazil